Calliotropis globosa is a species of sea snail, a marine gastropod mollusk in the family Eucyclidae.

Description
The height of the shell attains 10 mm.

Distribution
This marine species occurs off Mexico, Venezuela, Cuba, Guadeloupe, Jamaica and Barbados at depths between 732 m and 1829 m.

References

External links
 To Biodiversity Heritage Library (1 publication)
 To Encyclopedia of Life
 To USNM Invertebrate Zoology Mollusca Collection
 To World Register of Marine Species
 

globosa
Gastropods described in 1991